Brajkishore Prasad (1877–1946) was a lawyer inspired by Mohandas Gandhi during the Indian Independence Movement.

Early life and education 
Born in a Kayastha family in Srinagar, Siwan district, Prasad gained his early education in Chhapra and Patna before moving to Presidency College in Calcutta, where he completed his legal training.

He married Phuljhari Devi. He set up a legal practise in Darbhanga and had two sons, Vishwa Nath and Shiv Nath Prasad, more commonly known as SN Prasad, and two daughters, Prabhavati Devi and Vidyawati.

Career 
He met with Mahatma Gandhi in 1915 and was inspired. He decided to get involved full-time in the freedom struggle and gave up his legal practice. He was instrumental in Gandhi taking up the Champaran and Kheda Satyagraha, in which Gandhi handpicked Rajendra Prasad and Anugrah Narayan Sinha along with him to successfully lead the movement. Gandhi was so impressed by Prasad's dedication that he set aside a full chapter on him in his autobiographical book, The Story of My Experiments with Truth, called "The Gentle Bihari".

Prasad remained at the forefront of the freedom struggle in Bihar, and his collaboration with several colleagues was instrumental in the setting up of the Bihar Vidyapeeth. For the last ten years of his life he was severely infirmed, and died in 1946.

The National Book Trust, India, recently published a biography titled Braja Kishore Prasad: The Hero of Many Battles, authored by Sachidanand Sinha..

References

1877 births
1946 deaths
Presidency University, Kolkata alumni
Indian independence activists from Bihar
People from Siwan district
University of Calcutta alumni
People from Patna
Prisoners and detainees of British India
Founders of Indian schools and colleges
Gandhians
19th-century Indian lawyers
20th-century Indian lawyers
Lawyers in British India